Alexandrou is a Greek surname, meaning "son of Alexander". Notable people with the surname include:

 Aris Alexandrou (1922–1978), Greek novelist, poet and translator
 James Alexandrou (born 1985), English actor
 Nektarios Alexandrou (born 1983), Cypriot footballer

Greek-language surnames
Patronymic surnames
Surnames from given names